Tarnished Heroes is a 1961 British war film directed by Ernest Morris and starring Dermot Walsh and Anton Rodgers. It was produced by Danziger Productions. The film is set in France during World War II, and concerns a British major who destroys a Nazi convoy.
The plot of the film bears similarities to The Dirty Dozen, although it was made five years before Robert Aldrich's film, and three years before the novel on which it is based. However, it is possible that Tarnished Heroes was inspired by the success of The Magnificent Seven, released in 1960, as the concept seems close: the recruitment of a band of renegades to fight a difficult fight for the common good.

Plot
When Major Roy Bell (Walsh) and his company are trapped by the advancing German army, Bell decides to embark on a suicide mission to blow up a bridge which is of strategic importance to the enemy. However, the only resource available to him is a group of rag-tag army failures, made up of drunks, thieves and deserters. According to the officer's handbook, 'an officer will perform whatever task confronts him with whatever men are available'. Under Bell's guidance, these men must now rise to the challenge and prove themselves as heroes if they are to fulfil the mission and come back alive.

Cast
Major Roy Bell -	Dermot Walsh
Private Donald Conyers -	Anton Rodgers
Private Timothy Reilly -	Patrick McAlinney
Private Frederick Burton -	Richard Carpenter
Private Thomas Mason -	Maurice Kaufmann
Private Anthony Burton -	Max Butterfield
Private Bernard White -	Brian Peck
Private Walter Hoyt -	Hugh David
Corporal -	Graham Stewart
Col. Moreton -	John Scott
Capt. Mead -	Stuart Hillier
Josette -	Sheila Whittingham
Flamoun -	Andreas Malandrinos
Trench Officer -	Frank Thornton
Officer -	Richard Bennett
Officer -	Eric Corrie
Stunt Coordinator -	Ray Austin

Critical reception
Tortillafilms wrote, "Ernest Morris makes a good little film." Sky Movies noted, " things are reassuringly in their place with Dermot Walsh, hero of a fistful of `B' movies, at the head of the cast. In a small role as a trench officer, you may spot Frank Thornton, later well-known on television for his long-running role in Are You Being Served?."

References

External links

1961 films
Films set in France
British World War II films
1960s English-language films
Films directed by Ernest Morris
1960s British films